Magiritsa is a Greek soup made from lamb offal, associated  with the Easter (Pascha) tradition of the Greek Orthodox Church. Accordingly, Greek-Americans and Greek-Canadians sometimes call it "Easter soup", "Easter Sunday soup", or "Easter lamb soup". In some parts of Greece, most notably Thessaly, it is not served as soup but rather as a fricassee, where it contains only offal and large variety of vegetables, but no onions or rice, as in the soup.

Traditional use
Magiritsa is eaten to break the fast of the Greek Orthodox Great Lent, the 40 days before Easter. Its role and ingredients result from its association with the roasted lamb traditionally served at the Paschal meal; in its traditional form, magiritsa consists of the offal removed from the lamb before roasting, flavored with seasonings and sauces. Prepared on Holy Saturday along with the next day's lamb, magiritsa is consumed immediately after the midnight Divine Liturgy.

Ingredients and preparation
While traditional magiritsa includes all the lamb offal available, it is the head and neck of the lamb which provide most of the soup's flavor, and those parts, along with the intestines, heart, and liver, are most commonly used today.

After a thorough cleaning, the lamb parts are boiled whole in water for between thirty minutes and two hours, then cut up into smaller pieces, flavored with onions, dill, butter and sometimes vegetables, and left to simmer. Rice is added towards the end of the boiling process, and the stock is thickened with avgolemono.

When consumed in the early hours of the Paschal morning after church, magiritsa is sometimes accompanied by salad and cheese, tsoureki sweet bread, and hard-boiled eggs dyed red as a symbol of the risen Christ's blood.

See also
 List of soups

References

Greek soups
Easter food
National dishes
Easter traditions in Greece